Rabbi Benzion Aryeh Leibish Halberstam is the current Rabbi of the Bobov Hasidic dynasty.

He was born in 1955 to the third Bobover rebbe, Grand Rabbi Shlomo Halberstam and his second wife; Grand Rabbi Shlomo had lost his first wife and most of their children in the Holocaust. His son from his first marriage, Naftali Halberstam, survived and would eventually become the fourth Bobver Rebber.

After his father's passing in 2000, Rabbi Benzion Aryeh Leibish older brother, Grand Rabbi Naftali Halberstam was appointed to be the fourth Bobover Rebbe, and Rabbi Benzion Aryeh Leibish was appointed as Rav Hatza'ir ("Younger" Rabbi). After the passing of Rabbi Naftali Halberstam in 2005, Rabbi Benzion Aryeh Leibish was appointed to be the fifth Bobover Rebbe.

Rebbes of Bobov
Rabbi Shlomo Halberstam (1847–1905), grandson of the Sanzer Rebbe, Rabbi Chaim Halberstam
Rabbi Ben Zion Halberstam (1874–1941)
Rabbi Shlomo Halberstam (1907–2000)
Rabbi Naftali Halberstam (1931–2005), older son of Rabbi Shlomo Halberstam
 Rabbi Benzion Aryeh Leibish Halberstam(b. 1955), younger son of Rabbi Shlomo Halberstam

See also
Bobov
Bobowa, Poland
Rabbi Chaim Halberstam

References

External links
Kol Bobov: Bobover Music (Yiddish Site), of Ben Zion Halberstam
 Link to Bais Din Ruling (in Hebrew)
Halberstam family tree

1955 births
Living people
Rebbes of Bobov
American Hasidic rabbis
Rabbis from New York (state)
People from Borough Park, Brooklyn
Descendants of the Baal Shem Tov